Euproctis annulipes is a moth of the  family Erebidae. It is found in La Réunion.

References
Boisduval, J. B. A. 1833. Faune entomologique de Madagascar, Bourbon et Maurice. Lépidoptères. Avec des notes sur les moeurs, par M. Sganzin. - — :1–122, pls. 1–16.

Lymantriinae
Moths described in 1833
Moths of Réunion
Endemic fauna of Réunion